The United European Gastroenterology (UEG) is a non-profit organisation combining European societies concerned with digestive health.

About 
Founded in 1992 United European Gastroenterology (UEG) is the leading non-profit organisation for excellence in digestive health in Europe and beyond with its headquarters in Vienna. We improve the prevention and care of digestive diseases in Europe through providing top tier education, supporting research and advancing clinical standards.

As Europe’s home and umbrella for multidisciplinary gastroenterology, we unite over 50,000 engaged professionals from national and specialist societies, individual digestive health experts and related scientists from all fields and career stages. The myUEG Communityenables digestive health professionals from across the globe to become myUEG Associates and thereby connect, network and benefit from a wide range of free resources and educational activities.

Structure 
UEG unites 17 Ordinary Member Societies and 49 National Societies working in the broad area of digestive health, constantly adapting to the changing requirements of scientific research and health care.

Following our mission and a dedicated strategic plan, the overall leadership and strategic direction of UEG rests with the Council. The committees and task forces enable interested volunteers to play an active role in shaping current and future UEG initiatives and form the operating body of the organisation.

Member Societies are represented in the Meeting of Members that elects or appoints UEG Council members. Each Ordinary Member Society has the opportunity to send one representative to UEG’s committees. 

All officers of UEG, regardless of position, provide their effort and time on a complete voluntary basis, and therefore make UEG a non-profit organisation concerned solely with the well-being of patients.

UEG is a Regional Affiliate Association of the World Gastroenterology Organisation. UEG is a member of the European Medicines Agency, the Alliance for Biomedical Research, the AC Forum, and Pancreatic Cancer Europe.

UEG Presidents:
 2022-2023: Helena Cortez-Pinto
 2020–2021: Axel Dignaß
 2018–2019: Paul Fockens
2016–2017: Michael Manns
 2014–2015: Michael Farthing 
 2012–2013: Colm O'Morain 
 2010–2011: Rolf Hultcrantz 
 2008–2009: Juan R. Malagelada
 2006–2007: Anthony Axon
 2005: Peter Ferenci
 2004: Peter Malfertheiner 
 2003: Peter Milla
 2002: Christoph Beglinger
 2001: Alberto Montori 
 2000: Mario Mondelli 
 1999: Edward Farthman
 1998: Constantine Arvanitakis
 1997: Jacques Schmitz
 1995: Klaus Gyr
 1994: Peter Jansen
 1992: Vincenzo Speranza

Headquarters 

The House of European Gastroenterology (HEG) is UEG's home and offers a meeting point and communication hub to the European gastroenterological community. The HEG is situated in the heart of Vienna, near the Rathaus (City Hall) in a 19th-century building.

To further increase the visibility and impact of digestive health among the public and politicians, UEG runs a separate Brussels Office in Belgium.

Activities

UEG Week 
UEG Week is the largest congress  of its kind in Europe and is held once a year. It has been running since 1992 and now attracts more than 13,000 people from around the world. It features the latest advances in clinical management and  research in the field of digestive and liver disease. A two-day Postgraduate Teaching Programme is also held on occasion of UEG Week. The programme provides continuing medical education for gastroenterologists in training and practice.

Education 
UEG provides educational online and classroom courses in the field of digestive and liver disease and an online library containing abstracts and recordings of UEG Week, guidelines and more.

UEG EU Affairs 
UEG aims to act as a united voice of European gastroenterology in the Institutions of the European Union and the governments of the member states in order to promote digestive health in Europe.

Awards and grants 
UEG offers awards and grants in the following fields and categories: grants for researchers under the age of 40, grants for researchers having achieved the highest level of international recognition, funds for innovative educational programmes and international scientific collaborations, a prize honouring outstanding contribution to gastroenterology and UEG, international scholarship awards, prizes for best abstracts and travel grants.

Notable publications

UEG Journal 
Focuses on providing coverage of both translational as well as clinical studies from different fields of gastroenterology. The latest impact factor ranking indicates that the UEG Journal has already established itself as an authoritative, high quality and trusted journal in the field.

UEG White Book:  Survey of digestive health in Europe 
Summary of burden of digestive diseases in Europe and an assessment of the breadth and quality of current service provision.

References

External links

Gastroenterology organizations
Organisations based in Vienna
1992 establishments in Austria
Non-profit organisations based in Austria